Richardoestesia is a morphogenus of theropod dinosaur teeth, originally described from the Late Cretaceous of what is now North America. It currently contains two species, R. gilmorei and R. isosceles. It has been used as a morphotaxon to describe other theropod teeth widely displaced in time and space from the type species. If all teeth assigned to the genus are truly reflective of the animals biology and taxonomic state, it would have been one of the longest lasting dinosaur genera, prehaps also being the most widely distributed.

History 

 
The jaws were found in 1917 by Charles Hazelius Sternberg and sons in the Dinosaur Provincial Park in Alberta at the Little Sandhill Creek site. In 1924 Charles Whitney Gilmore named Chirostenotes pergracilis and referred the jaws to this species. In the 1980s it became clear that Chirostenotes was an oviraptorosaur to which the long jaws could not have belonged. Therefore, in 1990 Phillip Currie, John Keith Rigby and Robert Evan Sloan named a separate species: Richardoestesia gilmorei. 

The genus is named for Richard Estes, to honor his important work on small vertebrates and especially theropod teeth of the Late Cretaceous. The naming authors actually intended to use the spelling Ricardoestesia, Ricardus being the normal latinisation of "Richard". However, except in one overlooked figure caption, the editors of the paper altered the spelling to include the 'h'. Ironically, in 1991 George Olshevsky in a species list also used the spelling Richardoestesia, and indicated Ricardoestesia to be the misspelling, unaware that the original authors actually intended the name to be spelled this way. As a result, under ICZN rules, he acted as "first revisor" choosing between the two spelling variants of the original publication and inadvertently made the misspelt name official. Subsequently, the original authors have adopted the spelling Richardoestesia. The specific name honors Gilmore.

Species 
The holotype specimen of Richardoestesia gilmorei (NMC 343) consists of a pair of lower jaws found in the upper Judith River Group, dating from the Campanian age, about 75 million years ago. The jaws are slender and rather long, 193 millimeters, but the teeth are small and very finely serrated with five to six denticles per millimeter. The serration density is a distinctive trait of the species.

In 2001, Julia Sankey named a second species: Richardoestesia isosceles, based on a tooth, LSUMGS 489:6238, from the Texan Aguja Formation, which is of a longer and less recurved type. The teeth of R. isosceles have also been identified as crocodyliform in shape, possibly belonging to a sebecosuchian.

Classification 
 
Richardoestesia-like teeth have been found in many Late Cretaceous geological formations, including the Horseshoe Canyon Formation, the Scollard Formation, Hell Creek Formation, Ferris Formation, and the Lance Formation (dated to about 66 million years ago). Similar teeth have been referred to this genus from as early as the Barremian age (Cedar Mountain Formation, 125 million years ago).

Because of the disparity in location and time of the many referred teeth, researchers have cast doubt on the idea that they all belong to the same genus or species, and the genus is best considered a form taxon. A comparative study of the teeth published in 2013 demonstrated that both R. gilmorei and R. isosceles were only definitively present in the Dinosaur Park Formation, dated to between 76.5 and 75 million years ago. R. isosceles was also present in the Aguja Formation, roughly the same age. All other referred teeth most likely belong to different species, which have not been named due to the lack of body fossils for comparison.

Fossils of Richardoestesia have also been found in the Tremp Formation of northeastern Spain (Blasi 2 member).

Paleobiology

 
At least a few studies have speculated a piscivorous lifestyle for Richardoestesia, due to its vast distribution as well as predominance in marine sites.

References

Further reading 
 Baszio, S. 1997. Investigations on Canadian dinosaurs: systematic palaeontology of isolated dinosaur teeth from the Latest Cretaceous of Dinosaur Provincial Park, Alberta, Canada. Courier Forschungsinstitut Senckenberg 196:33-77.
 Sankey, J. T., D. B. Brinkman, M. Guenther, and P. J. Currie. 2002. Small theropod and bird teeth from the Late Cretaceous (Late Campanian) Judith River Group, Alberta. Journal of Paleontology 76(4):751-763.

External links 
 
 The "Ricardoestesia typo" is described
 First message of a passionate Ricardoestesia versus Richardoestesia debate

Prehistoric coelurosaurs
Maastrichtian life
Late Cretaceous dinosaurs of Europe
Cretaceous Spain
Fossils of Spain
La Huérguina Formation
Tremp Formation
Late Cretaceous dinosaurs of North America
Cretaceous Canada
Fossils of Canada
Paleontology in Alberta
Ojo Alamo Formation
Campanian genus first appearances
Maastrichtian genus extinctions
Fossil taxa described in 1990
Taxa named by Philip J. Currie